George Carney (21 November 1887 – 9 December 1947) was a British comedian and film actor.

Born in Bristol, he worked in the Liverpool Cotton Exchange, in a furniture business, then in the Belfast shipyards.  In 1906 he made his debut stage appearance in a pantomime in Nottingham, with his first London appearance following in 1907, as one half of a double act, Carney and Armstrong.  They toured together in Britain, Australia and South Africa before Carney set up revues with another comedian, Sam Harris.  From 1926, he worked on stage as a solo comedian, with such sketches as "The Fool of the Force", "The Stage Door Keeper", and "I Live in Leicester Square".  He then took up a film career, appearing as a character actor in numerous British films, including Love on the Dole (1941) and Brighton Rock (1947).

He died in London in 1947.

Complete filmography

 Commissionaire (1933) - Sergeant Ted Seymour
 The Television Follies (1933) - Father
 Say It with Flowers (1934) - Bill Woods
 The Night Club Queen (1934) - Hale
 Red Ensign (1934) - Mr. Lindsey (uncredited)
 Music Hall (1934) - Bill
 Easy Money (1934) - Boggie
 A Glimpse of Paradise (1934) - Jim Bogsworth
 Hyde Park (1934) - Joe Smith
 Flood Tide (1934) - Captain Bill Buckett
 Lest We Forget (1934) - Sergeant Jock
 A Real Bloke (1935) - Bill
 City of Beautiful Nonsense (1935) - Chesterton
 Windfall (1935) - Syd
 Cock o' the North (1935) - George Barton
 Variety (1935) - Minor Role
 The Small Man (1936) - Bill Edwards
 It's in the Bag (1936) - Blumfield
 Tomorrow We Live (1936) - Mr. Taylor
 Land Without Music (1936) - Prison Warder
 Some Waiter! (1936 short)
 Thunder in the City (1937) - Harry Hopper (uncredited)
 Dreaming Lips (1937) - Rescuer
 Beauty and the Barge (1937) - Tom Codd
 Father Steps Out (1937) - Joe Hardcastle
 Smash and Grab (1937) - Engine Driver (uncredited)
 Lancashire Luck (1937) - George Lovejoy
 Little Miss Somebody (1937) - Angus Duncan
 Easy Riches (1938) - Sam Miller
 Paid in Error (1938) - Will Baker
 Kicking the Moon Around (1938) - Police Constable Truscott
 Weddings Are Wonderful (1938) - Rogers
 When We Are Married (1938 TV movie) - Henry Ormonroyd
 Consider Your Verdict (1938 short) - The Butcher
 Miracles Do Happen (1938) - Mr. F. Greenlaw
 Young Man's Fancy (1939) - Chairman
 Come On George! (1939) - Sgt. Johnson
 Where's That Fire? (1940) - Councillor (uncredited)
 The Stars Look Down (1939) - Slogger Gowlan
 A Window in London (1940) - Night Watchman
 Convoy (1940) - Bates
 The Briggs Family (1940) - George Downing
 Kipps (1941) - Old Pornick (scenes deleted)
 Love on the Dole (1941) - Mr. Hardcastle
 The Common Touch (1941) - Charlie
 Hard Steel (1942) - Bert Mortimer
 The Day Will Dawn (1942) - Harry, Soldier in Fleet Street Pub
 Unpublished Story (1942) - Landlord
 In Which We Serve (1942) - Mr. Blake
 Thunder Rock (1942) - Harry
 Rose of Tralee (1942) - Collett
 When We Are Married (1943) - Landlord
 Schweik's New Adventures (1943) - Gendarme
 The Night Invader (1943) - Conductor
 Tawny Pipit (1944) - Whimbrel
 Welcome, Mr. Washington (1944) - Publican
 Soldier, Sailor (1944)
 Waterloo Road (1945) - Tom Mason
 The Agitator (1945) - Bill Shackleton
 I Know Where I'm Going! (1945) - Mr. Webster
 Wanted for Murder (1946) - Boat Rental Agent
 Spring Song (1946) - Stage Door Keeper (uncredited)
 The Root of All Evil (1947) - Bowser
 Woman to Woman (1947) - Taxi Driver
 The Little Ballerina (1947) - Bill
 Fortune Lane (1947) - Mr. Quentin
 Brighton Rock (1947) - Phil Corkery
 Good-Time Girl (1948) - Mr. Rawlings

References

External links

1887 births
1947 deaths
English male film actors
Male actors from Bristol
20th-century English male actors